SVW may refer to:
 Shanghai Volkswagen Automotive, an automobile manufacturing company headquartered in Anting, Shanghai, China
 Global Jet Luxembourg, the ICAO code SVW
 Sparrevohn LRRS Airport, the IATA code SVW